Soulja or Souljah may refer to:

People
Sister Souljah (born 1964), American author, activist, musician, and film producer
SoulJa (rapper) (born 1983), Japanese rapper from Tokyo
Soulja Boy (born 1990), American rapper
Soulja Slim (1977–2003), American rapper

Other
 A bastardization of the word "soldier" 
 A compound word, alluding to "soul" and "Jah"

See also
 Soldier (disambiguation)